Fushimi (伏見) is an area located in Nishiki, Naka-ku, Nagoya, central Japan.

History 
It was originally called Fushimi-chō (伏見町), which was abolished as an official administrative unit in 1966. Located next to it to the west is Funairi-chō.

The nearest station is Fushimi Station on the Nagoya Municipal Subway. The Fushimi Underground Shopping Street extends along the railway line from the ticket gate.

Fukuromachi-dori (長者町繊維街) at the northern part of the station was bustling with textile stores after the war. Today, there are shops selling textiles, clothing, and miscellaneous goods, as well as interior shops and cafes.

The area around the station is a financial and office district. There are also theatres, museums, and science museums.

Main points 
 Shirakawa Park
 Nagoya City Science Museum
 Nagoya City Art Museum
 Misono-za
 Electricity Museum, Nagoya
 Shirakawa Hall
 Nagoya Kanko Hotel
 Hilton Nagoya
 Nagoya Crown Hotel
 Asahi Shimbun Nagoya Head Office
 Yomiuri Shimbun Chubu Branch
 Shin-Nagoya Musical Theater
 Nagoya Chamber of Commerce and Industry
 Bank of Japan Nagoya Branch
 Nagoya City Fire Department Naka Fire Department
 Fushimi Underground Shopping Street
 Nagoya Intercity
 NTT Data Fushimi Building

Traffic 

 Fushimi Station (Nagoya) serviced by the Nagoya Municipal Subway Higashiyama Line / Tsurumai Line 
 "Hirokoji Fushimi" stop Nagoya Municipal Bus
 Fushimi-dōri (National Route 19 and National Route 22) 
 Nishiki-dōri
 Hirokoji Street (Aichi Prefectural Road No. 60 Nagoya Nagakutede Line)

References

External links 

Financial districts
Naka-ku, Nagoya
Sakae, Nagoya